Bareh Sara (also Romanized as Bareh Sarā; also known as Baresarā) is a village in Dinachal Rural District, Pareh Sar District, Rezvanshahr County, Gilan Province, Iran. At the 2006 census, its population was 361, in 94 families.

References 

Populated places in Rezvanshahr County